Daniel Harper may refer to:

 Daniel Harper (athlete), Canadian track and field athlete
 Daniel Harper (headmaster), principal of Jesus College, Oxford
 Daniel Harper (racing driver), racing driver from Northern Ireland